The Tree of Blood is a 2018 Spanish-French drama film written and directed by Julio Medem. It stars Úrsula Corberó and Álvaro Cervantes alongside Najwa Nimri, Maria Molins, Patricia López Arnaiz, Daniel Grao, Joaquín Furriel, Emilio Gutiérrez Caba, Luisa Gavasa, José María Pou and Ángela Molina.

Cast

Production 
A Spanish-French co-production, the film was produced by Arcadia Motion Pictures, Galatea Films, Diamond Films España, Aixerrota Films and Noodles Production, with the participation of EiTB and Movistar+ and support from ICAA and Eurimages. Shooting locations included the Basque Country, Catalonia and Madrid.

Release
Distributed by Diamond Films, the film was theatrically released in Spain on October 31, 2018.

See also 
 List of Spanish films of 2018

References

External links 
 
 
 

2018 films
2018 drama films
Spanish drama films
2010s Spanish-language films
Films shot in the Basque Country (autonomous community)
Films shot in Catalonia
Films shot in Madrid
Arcadia Motion Pictures films
2010s Spanish films
Films directed by Julio Medem